Llanhilleth railway station is a railway station on the Ebbw Valley Railway and serves the village of Llanhilleth, Wales.

History
The original Llanhilleth railway station was opened by the Great Western Railway on 1 October 1901, but it was closed on 30 April 1962 
The present station is situated slightly to the East of the old one and reopened on 27 April 2008, nearly three months after services between Cardiff Central and Ebbw Vale Parkway railway station commenced. Plans include hourly services to Newport.

The station at Llanhilleth is situated to the rear of properties on Commercial Road, and opposite Railway Street, near the former station location. Access to the station and car park is provided off Commercial Road. The station currently has a single platform to serve both directions. The Ebbw Vale line received upgrades since reopening, with the branch extended to Ebbw Vale Town, and with an additional station opened at Pye Corner.

Along with this, there are plans for an hourly train from Ebbw Vale to Newport; to accommodate the extra services, a passing loop and second platform will be built at Llanhilleth.

Services
The normal service on Monday to Saturday is one train per hour in each direction; these terminate at Ebbw Vale Town and Cardiff Central. On Sundays, trains run approximately every two hours, via Newport.

References

External links

Planning Approval Granted for New Railway Station
Archive of Ebbw Valley Railway Scheme website (Blaenau Gwent council, 2008)

Railway stations in Blaenau Gwent
DfT Category F2 stations
Railway stations opened by Network Rail
Former Great Western Railway stations
Railway stations in Great Britain opened in 1901
Railway stations in Great Britain closed in 1962
Railway stations in Great Britain opened in 2008
Railway stations served by Transport for Wales Rail